Messalina vs. the Son of Hercules is a 1964 peplum film directed  by Umberto Lenzi and starring Richard Harrison and Lisa Gastoni.

Plot

Cast

 Richard Harrison as  Glaucus
 Lisa Gastoni as Messalina
 Marilù Tolo as Ena
  Philippe Hersent as Claudius
 Jean Claudio as Silius
  Gianni Solaro as Cassius Chaerea
 John McDouglas as Lucilius
  Charles Borromel as Caligula
 Maria Laura Rocca as Procusa
 Lydia Alfonsi
 Livio Lorenzon as Prefect of the court  
 Enzo Fiermonte

Release
Messalina vs. the Son of Hercules was released on June 27, 1964. In Italy, it had a runtime of 98 minutes and was titled L'ultimo gladiatore.

References

Sources

External links

Messalina vs. the Son of Hercules at Variety Distribution

1960s adventure films
Peplum films
French historical adventure films
Films directed by Umberto Lenzi
Films set in the Roman Empire
Films set in the 1st century
Films about gladiatorial combat
Cultural depictions of Claudius
Cultural depictions of Messalina
Depictions of Caligula on television
Sword and sandal films
1960s Italian films